Joy is the only solo album by British singer Paul King, released in 1987, on CBS after King, the band he was lead singer for split up in 1986.

The album was produced by American musician Dan Hartman. It failed to chart, and only produced a minor hit out of two single releases: "I Know", which stalled at number 59, and "Follow My Heart", which failed to chart in the UK top 75.

Overview
The album was more pop rock-oriented than the more new wave-sounding albums by the King group. The album contains extensive use of brass (being especially evident in the first single "I Know"), played by The Uptown Horns quartet, as well as background vocals, recorded in two separate sessions, one held in Detroit and the other in New York. The singer Nona Hendryx features on backing vocals on track "Slow Motion".

The song "Star" was co-written by Paul along with ex colleague Mike Roberts, keyboard player in the King band. Perry Haines' management and The Unity Club fan club were also unchanged.

Track listing
"Follow My Heart" - 4:43 (P. King/D. Hartman)
"When You Smile" - 4:24 (P. King/D. Hartman/P.Haines)
"I Know" - 3:37 (P. King/D. Hartman/C. Midnight)
"Pass on By" - 3:37 (P. King)
"Some Risks" - 4:20 (P. King)
"One Too Many Heartaches" - 3:58 (P. King/D. Hartman/C. Midnight)
"Star" - 3:21 (P. King/M. Roberts)
"It's Up to You" - 3:12 (P. King)
"So Brutal" - 5:00 (P. King)
"Slow Motion" - 3:57 (P. King/D. Hartman/C. Midnight)
"Glory's Goal" - 3:12 (P.King)

Singles
1987 - "I Know" (UK #59)
1987 - "Follow My Heart"

Personnel

Paul King: vocals, piano and synth
David Beal: drums
T. M. Stevens: bass guitar
Philippe Saisse, Robbie Kilgore: keyboards
Phil Grande (#2, 3, 6, 7, 10); Carlos Alomar (#1, 6); Graham Simmonds (#5, 8, 9, 10, 11); Steve Conti (#6): guitars
Mino Cinelu, Linda Curtis: percussion
Crispin Cioe: alto baritone saxophone
Bob Funk: trombone
Arno Hecht: tenor saxophone
Hollywood Paul Litteral: trumpet
Nona Hendryx: background vocals #10
Carolyn Franklin & The Prima Donnas (Brenda Corbett & Margaret Branch): background vocals  Detroit sessions
B.J. Nelson, Maggie Ryder, Kurtis King, Charlie Midnight, Dan Hartman: background vocals New York sessions

Production:
Dan Hartman: producer, additional guitar and keyboards
Chris Lord Alge: mixing
Rod Hui: additional recording
Bill Smith Studio: sleeve design
Butch Martin: photography
Bill Smith: location photography
Perry Haines for Dolphins Lovers Limited: management

References

External links
Eil.com: cover art and track listing

1987 debut albums
Pop rock albums by English artists
King (band) albums
Albums produced by Dan Hartman